Sant Feliu de Pallerols is a village in the province of Girona and autonomous community of Catalonia, Spain.

From 1902, Sant Feliu de Pallerols was linked to Girona by the narrow gauge Olot–Girona railway, which was extended to Olot in 1911. The line closed in 1969 and has since been converted into a greenway.

References

External links
 Government data pages 

Municipalities in Garrotxa